Alexander Demetri Franklin (born July 11, 1988) is a Puerto Rican-American professional basketball player for Gigantes de Carolina of the Baloncesto Superior Nacional (BSN). He is best known for his college career at Siena College and as a member of the Puerto Rican national team.

Franklin, a small forward from Reading, Pennsylvania, played at Siena from 2006 to 2010.  In his time there, he led the Saints to three Metro Atlantic Athletic Conference (MAAC) titles and was named the MAAC Player of the Year and an AP honorable mention All-American as a senior in 2009–10.  He left the school with 1,730 points and 930 rebounds for his career.

Following college, Franklin played professionally in Spain and France as well as several teams in Puerto Rico's Baloncesto Superior Nacional.  In 2012, Franklin led the Mayagüez Indians to its first championship and was named playoff MVP.

In February 2015, he signed with Maccabi Ra'anana of Israel. In May 2015, he signed with Vaqueros de Bayamón of Puerto Rico.

Franklin, whose mother is Puerto Rican, first played for Puerto Rico's national team at 2012 Centrobasket.  On August 19, 2014, Franklin was named to Puerto Rico's squad for the 2014 FIBA Basketball World Cup.

References

External links
 FIBA profile
 LNB Pro B profile

1988 births
Living people
2014 FIBA Basketball World Cup players
2019 FIBA Basketball World Cup players
Abejas de León players
American expatriate basketball people in France
American expatriate basketball people in Israel
American expatriate basketball people in Mexico
American expatriate basketball people in Spain
American men's basketball players
Atléticos de San Germán players
Baloncesto Superior Nacional players
Basketball players from Pennsylvania
CB Peñas Huesca players
CB Tarragona players
Central American and Caribbean Games bronze medalists for Puerto Rico
Central American and Caribbean Games medalists in basketball
Competitors at the 2014 Central American and Caribbean Games
JA Vichy players
Real Estelí Baloncesto players
Maccabi Ra'anana players
Puerto Rican expatriate basketball people in Nicaragua
Puerto Rican men's basketball players
Siena Saints men's basketball players
Small forwards
Soles de Mexicali players
Sportspeople from Reading, Pennsylvania
Puerto Rican expatriate basketball people in Israel
Puerto Rican expatriate basketball people in Mexico
American expatriate basketball people in Nicaragua